Otis L. Anthony II (born July 12, 1979) is an American pastor, financial planner, and Democratic politician. He is a current member of the Mississippi House of Representatives, having served since 2019.

Biography 
Otis L. Anthony II was born on July 12, 1979, in Indianola, Mississippi. He graduated from Gentry High School, Tougaloo College, and Agape Bible College, where he received a bachelor's degree in theology. Previously, he was an alderman of Indianola, Mississippi. He became a member of the Mississippi House of Representatives from the 31st district in 2019.

References 

1979 births
Living people
Democratic Party members of the Mississippi House of Representatives
People from Indianola, Mississippi